Yukhari Mahalla Synagogue, in translation from Azerbaijani . - "Synagogue of the Upper Quarter", is a synagogue of the 19th century located in the city of Oghuz in the Republic of Azerbaijan.

History 
The Synagogue of the Upper Quarter, located on the Arzu Aliyeva Street in the city of Oghuz, was built in 1897 with the assistance and guidance of Rabbi Barukh. After Soviet occupation, the synagogue, like other places of worship, was closed and later used as a warehouse.

Already during the times of the independence of the Republic of Azerbaijan, the synagogue was restored by the local Jews in 2004-2006. It is currently used as a place of worship where every Friday and Saturday the synagogue is visited by the Jews of Oghuz to pray.

Photos

See also 
 History of the Jews in Azerbaijan

References

Synagogues in Oghuz